Candiacervus is an extinct genus of deer native to Pleistocene Crete. Due to a lack of other herbivores, the genus underwent an adaptive radiation, filling niches occupied by other taxa on the mainland. Due to the small size of Crete, the genus underwent insular dwarfism, the smallest species, C. ropalophorus, stood about 40 cm at the shoulders when fully grown, as can be inferred from a mounted skeleton. Some species (C. ropalophorus) are noted for their peculiar, spatula-shaped antlers, though other species have normal albeit miniaturized antlers. Other features are the relatively short limbs, the massivity of the bones and the simplified antler.

They were traditionally considered to be related to the giant Irish elk, with some experts regarding Candiacervus as a subgenus of Megaloceros. However, van der Geer (2018) finds them closer to Dama.

Taxonomy 
 
The Cretan deer is a typical example of taxonomical problems involving endemic insular mammals, due to the much larger variety than on the mainland, and the strong endemism. This obscures taxonomy, because many endemic features of Candiacervus are not unique but are found in other island deer as well, such as Cervus astylodon (Ryukyu Islands) and Hoplitomeryx (Southern Italy).
De Vos (1979, 1984, 1996) identified eight morphotypes into one genus (Candiacervus), whereas Capasso Barbato (1992) included the larger species, rethymnensis, major and dorothensis, in Cervus (subgenus Leptocervus) and the smaller species ropalophorus and cretensis in Megaloceros (subgenus Candiacervus), implying two different ancestors, and she also did not recognize sp. II with its three morphotypes, instead referring it to ropalophorus. A new paper published in 2018 rejected the conclusion of Capasso Barbato (1992) and formally named the three morphotypes of De Vos' Candiacervus sp. II C. devosi, C. listeri, and C. reumeri.

On the nearby island of Karpathos, Kuss found deer which were, in his view, similar to the Cretan deer. Therefore, he grouped his species pygadiensis and cerigensis under the genus Candiacervus, but this needs further confirmation. As long as no direct link with Crete is attested, the deer genus of Karpathos is questioned, and better referred to as Cervus.

Description 
 
The Cretan deer is represented by no less than eight different morphotypes, ranging from dwarf size with withers height of about 40 cm to very large with withers height  of about 165 cm.  This is explained as a sympatric speciation to occupy all possible empty niches ranging from dense forest to prickly rocks.  The coexistence of various environments has been confirmed by studies on the rich fossil avifauna.  The most typical Cretan deer are the two smallest sizes, which have not only relatively and absolutely short limbs, but also long and simplified antlers; these species occupied a niche close to that of the wild goat of Crete today: barren rocks with thorny bushes, as shown by features of their osteology and goat-like body proportions.  It deviated so much from mainland deer that it is impossible to indicate with certainty its ancestor.  Suggested ancestors are Pseudodama peloponnesiacus and Praemegaceros verticornis.

Ecology 
The fauna of which Candiacervus is an element is called Biozone II, or the Mus Zone (after the common mouse). This fauna inhabited Crete between the late Middle and Late Pleistocene, which means between 0.3 and 0.01 million years ago.

The typical fauna elements of this biozone are the common mouse (Mus bateae, M. minotaurus), the dwarf hippo (Hippopotamus creutzburgi) the dwarf elephant (Elephas antiquus creutzburgi), the Cretan deer (Candiacervus, with the eight species ropalophorus, sp. IIa, b and c, cretensis, rethymnensis, dorothensis and major), the Cretan otter (Lutrogale (Isolalutra) cretensis), and the Cretan shrew (Crocidura zimmermanni).

Extinction 

From the late Middle Pleistocene till the arrival of humans in the Holocene, Crete was inhabited by small elephants, eight types of Cretan deer and a normal sized mouse.  The cause of the dramatic faunal turnover, which led to the extinction of the endemic deer and elephants, may simply have been the arrival of paleolithic humans.  They could have exterminated the deer either actively by hunting, or passively by destroying its habitat.  Another option is a gradual depletion of the ecosystem, as indicated by the finding of a complete herd consisting of individuals suffering a bone disease of an osteosclerotic nature (see X-ray photograph). The impact of paleolithic humans is at present still unproven, partly because of the scarcity on published fauna lists from archaeological sites (except for Knossos), partly because of the insecurely dated materials.

References

External links 
 Article on the mounting of a Candiacervus skeleton
 Scientific information on Candiacervus
 Past excavations on Crete
 New data on the Pleistocene Cretan deer Candiacervus sp. II (Cervinae, Mammalia) (2006)

Prehistoric deer
Pleistocene even-toed ungulates
Pleistocene mammals of Europe
Prehistoric even-toed ungulate genera
Prehistoric Crete